Modi River or Modi Khola is a tributary of Gandaki River in Parbat district of Nepal. It is a snow-fed perennial river　originating from Annapurna Mountains and has a catchment area of 675 km2. It meets the Kali Gandaki River at Modi Beni of Parbat District. The total length (from head to the confluence) of the river is approximately 50km. The main tributaries of Modi river are Bhurangdi Khola, Rati Khola, Pati Khola, Malyangdi Khola, Ghandruk Khola and Ambote Khola. The mean annual precipitation in the basin is approximately 2700mm and 80% of the total annual rainfall occurs during the monsoon.

Water Use
The river banks Modi Khola consists of forest area and few agricultural and cultivated land. It is argued that the water of the Modi Khola is not suitable for irrigation purpose as the water in the Khola mainly comes from the melting glaciers and is too cold for crops.

Fisheries
Commercial or traditional fish farms/ponds are not present in the Modi river. However, the river has various fish species (mainly Asala or Snow trout) naturally.  Other fish species are carps (Schizothorax  plagiostomus,  Schizothorax richardsonii, Schizothoraichthys progastus, Garra gotyla and  Garra  annandalei) and catfish (Glyptothorax pectinopterus and Pseudecheneis sulcata).

Drinking water
The water from Modi Khola is not used for drinking purpose.

Hydropowers
Following hydropower projects are either constructed, under-construction or under planning in this river, all of them are run-of-river types.
Upper Modi A Hydroelectric Power Plant (42MW)
Upper Modi Hydroelectric Power Plant(14MW)
Landruk Modi Hydroelectric Power Plant (86.59MW)
Middle Modi Khola Hydroelectric Power Plant(15.1MW) - under construction
Modi Khola Hydroelectric Power Plant(14.8MW) - operating
Lower Modi Khola Hydroelectric Power Plant(20MW) - under construction
Lower Modi-1 Hydroelectric Power Plant(10MW) - operating
Lower Modi-2 Hydropower Project(10.5MW)

Gallery

See also
Gandaki River

References

Rivers of Gandaki Province